This list contains combat vehicles which never left the design phase or had an extremely limited production (usually < 10).

Australia
 Australian Cruiser Tank Mark 3 "Thunderbolt"
 Australian Cruiser Tank Mark 4
 Rhino Heavy Armoured Car
 Australian experimental light tank

Canada
 Skink anti-aircraft tank

Germany

 Entwicklung Series Entwicklung series, a comprehensive redesign of German armor from small tracked vehicles to a 100-ton super-heavy tank. Only a single E-100 chassis was completed
 Leichttraktor, pre-war light tank, four built
 Neubaufahrzeug, pre-war heavy tank design, five built
 Panther II, development of the Panzerkampfwagen V "Panther". A single chassis was built
 Panzerkampfwagen VII "Löwe", a super-heavy tank project that never reached prototype stage
 Panzerkampfwagen VIII "Maus", a super-heavy tank. Two prototypes built
 Panzerkampfwagen IX & Panzerkampfwagen X Paper project
 Landkreuzer P. 1000 Ratte; paper project
 Landkreuzer P. 1500 Monster; paper project
 12.8 cm Selbstfahrlafette auf VK 30.01(H) "Sturer Emil" - tank destroyer; 2 built
 Heuschrecke 10, Krupp's design for a new self-propelled artillery gun
 VK 3001 (P) - medium tank; paper project
 VK 3002(DB) - prototype medium tank; one built
 VK 4501 (P) - Porsche Tiger tank; 100 hulls built, 90 converted to Ferdinands, one Tiger (P) built, 3 Bergepanzer Tiger (p) and 3 Rammtigers built. 
 Dicker Max, two prototypes built
 VK 20, medium tank proposed to replace the Panzer III and Panzer IV; paper project
 Panzer-Selbstfahrlafette II, half-track tank destroyer; two built
 Panzer-Selbstfahrlafette IV Ausf. C, SPG, 3 built
 Geschützwagen Tiger, self-propelled artillery gun; one partial prototype built
 VK 1602 Leopard, reconnaissance tank; paper project

Italy
Semovente da 20/70 quadruplo, self-propelled anti-aircraft gun
Semovente da 149/40, self-propelled gun
Fiat M16/43, fast medium tank
P43 heavy tank, Fiat Ansaldo's design for a new heavy tank.

Japan

 Type 95 heavy tank; 4 built in 1934
 Ji-Ro (or Ji-Ro Sha) Type 92 10 cm cannon self-propelled gun on Type 95 heavy tank chassis
 Hi-Ro Sha (or Hiro-sha) 10 cm cannon self-propelled gun on Type 95 Heavy tank chassis
 Type 97 Chi-Ni medium tank; one prototype built
 Type 98 Chi-Ho medium tank; 4 built, two in 1940 and two in 1941
 O-I super-heavy tank design in the 120-ton range. Exact stage of development unknown
 Type 98 Ta-Se single 20 mm self-propelled anti-aircraft gun on a Type 98 Ke-Ni chassis
 Type 98 20 mm AAG Tank twin 20 mm self-propelled anti-aircraft gun on a Type 98 Ke-Ni chassis
 ATG Carrier So-To; light armored transport with an AT Gun in Type 97 Te-Ke tankette structure
 Type 3 Ke-Ri light tank; a few prototypes were produced
 Type 2 Ku-Se 75 mm self-propelled gun on a Type 1 Chi-He chassis
 Type 4 Chi-To medium tank; two completed and four chassis manufactured
 Type 5 Chi-Ri medium tank; one incomplete prototype built
 Type 5 Ke-Ho light tank; one prototype built
 Type 4 Ho-To 12 cm self-propelled gun on a modified Type 95 Ha-Go chassis
 Type 5 Ho-Ru 47 mm self-propelled gun; a light tank destroyer akin to the German Hetzer; one prototype built
 Type 5 Na-To tank destroyer; two built
 Type 5 To-Ku amphibious tank
 Type 5 Ho-Ri tank destroyer with a 105 mm cannon and an additional 37 mm gun; exact status unknown
 Naval 12 cm SPG naval Type 10 120 mm gun on a Type 97 Chi-Ha chassis; one prototype built
 Ka-To or Ka-To Sha 105 mm SP AT Gun. Ka-To was a combination of the Type 5 Na-To open top superstructure and the extended hull of the Type 4 Chi-To. Exact stage of development unknown
 Type 5 15 cm SPG Ho-Chi or Ho-Chi Sha. Similar to Type 1 Ho-Ni I and Type 4 Ho-Ro SPGs, it had a Type 96 15 cm (149.1 mm) howitzer mounted on a Type 97 chassis. Stage of development unknown

New Zealand
 Schofield tank
 Bob Semple tank

Poland
 9TP light tank
 4TP (light) tank
 10TP tank
 14TP medium tank
 20/25TP medium tank
 PZInż 130 amphibious tank
 PZInż 152
 PZInż 202
 PZInż 222
 PZInż 303
 PZInż 342
 PZInż 603
 TKW (light) reconnaissance tank
 TKS-D light tank destroyer

Romania
 Mareșal tank destroyer
 TACAM T-38

Spain
 Verdeja

Soviet Union

 Antonov A-40
 T-43 medium tank
 SMK tank heavy tank; one built
 T-100 tank heavy tank
 SU-100Y Self-Propelled Gun 130mm gun on the T-100 chassis
 SU-14 heavy self-propelled gun on a T-35 chassis
 PPG tankette
 Object 416
 IS-6 Heavy tank
 IS-7 heavy tank; six prototypes built, cancelled in favor of the T-10
 KV-3
 KV-4 super-heavy tank; paper project
 KV-5
 KV-9
 KV-10
 KV-11
 KV-12
 KV-13 Three prototypes built.

United Kingdom
 Tank, Heavy, TOG I
 Tank Heavy, TOG II
 Tank, Heavy Assault, Excelsior (A33)
 Tank, Infantry, Valiant (A38)
 Tank, Heavy Assault, Tortoise (A39)
 Tank, Infantry, Black Prince (A43)
 A20 heavy tank
 Alecto

United States

 M6 heavy tank
 M7 Medium Tank
 M38 Wolfhound
 T14 Heavy Tank
 T18 Howitzer Motor Carriage; 75 mm howitzer on a M3 chassis
 T20 Medium Tank
 T27 Armored Car
 T28 Super Heavy Tank
 T29 Heavy Tank
 T30 Heavy Tank
 T32 Heavy Tank
 T34 Heavy Tank
 T40/M9 Tank Destroyer
 T54 Gun Motor Carriage
 T55E1 Gun Motor Carriage
 T82 Howitzer Motor Carriage
 T84 Howitzer Motor Carriage
 T88 Gun Motor Carriage; 105 mm howitzer on a M18 chassis
 T92 Howitzer Motor Carriage

See also
 List of armoured fighting vehicles of World War II

Prototype Combat vehicles